The Joshua Hempsted House is a historic house museum at 11 Hempstead Street in New London, Connecticut.  Built about 1678 and altered several times during the 18th century, it is one of the state's oldest surviving buildings, and provides a virtual catalog of early construction methods due to its state of preservation.  The house was acquired by Connecticut Landmarks in 1937, which operates it and the adjacent 1759 Nathaniel Hempstead House as a historic house museum complex known as the Hempsted Houses.  The houses have been restored to reflect a late 17th to mid 18th-century appearance, and was listed on the National Register of Historic Places in 1970.

Description and history
The Hempsted House is located west of downtown New London, on the east side of Hempstead Street between Hope and Truman Streets.  It is a -story wood-frame structure, with a side-gable roof that has two front-facing gables.  The left gable, in an unusual departure for houses of its age, projects forward of the main block, providing an enclosed vestibule on the first floor.  Window openings are generally narrow, and filled with diamond-pane casement windows.  The interior has exposed framing members that show the building's great age.

The oldest portion of the house was three bays wide, and was a typical one-room structure with a chimney on one end.  Although there is some disagreement by architectural historians, it was probably built c. 1678 by Joshua Hempstead, the father of local diarist Joshua Hempsted.  It is one of Connecticut's oldest surviving buildings, and has long been recognized for its architectural and historical significance, having been studied by Norman Isham and Frederick Kelly, prominent early architectural historians of the region.

The house supposedly escaped destruction during the 1780 Battle of Groton Heights, in which much of New London was destroyed, because the Hempsteads had prepared a large family reunion meal, which was appropriated by the raiding British forces.  It was used as a safe house as part of the Underground Railroad.  It remained in the Hempstead family until 1937, when it was acquired by the organization now known as Connecticut Landmarks.

See also

List of the oldest buildings in Connecticut
National Register of Historic Places listings in New London County, Connecticut

References

External links

Hempstead houses at Connecticut Landmarks

Houses on the National Register of Historic Places in Connecticut
Houses completed in 1678
Hempsted, Joshua House
Museums in New London County, Connecticut
Houses in New London, Connecticut
Tourist attractions in New London, Connecticut
Connecticut Landmarks
National Register of Historic Places in New London County, Connecticut
Historic district contributing properties in Connecticut
1678 establishments in Connecticut